Brian Sharoff (January 1, 1943 – May 23, 2020) was an American politician who served in the New York State Assembly from the 42nd district from 1971 to 1976.

Sharoff received his bachelor's degree from Hunter College in 1964 and his master's degree in international relations from Rutgers University in 1966. He served as president of the Private Label Manufacturers Association.

He died on May 23, 2020, at age 77.

References

1943 births
2020 deaths
Businesspeople from Brooklyn
Politicians from Brooklyn
Hunter College alumni
Rutgers University alumni
Democratic Party members of the New York State Assembly